A beauty mark is a type of mole considered attractive in some cultures. It can also refer to:

"Beauty Mark", a track on the 1998 album Rufus Wainwright
Beauty Mark, a 2017 American drama film
Beauty Marks (album), a 2019 album by Ciara
"Beauty Marked", the 34th episode of the TV series Danny Phantom

See also
 Rhetus periander, a type of butterfly called the Periander Metalmark or Variable Beautymar